Drosera neesii, the jewel rainbow is an erect or twining perennial tuberous species in the carnivorous plant genus Drosera. It is endemic to Western Australia and grows near swamps or granite outcrops in sand, clay, or laterite. Pink flowers bloom from August to December.

Drosera neesii was first described by Johann Georg Christian Lehmann in 1844. The first infraspecific taxon was described when George Bentham reduced D. sulphurea to a variety, a decision which was later reversed. Then in 1982, N. G. Marchant described a new subspecies, D. neesii subsp. borealis, which is only found in the species' northern range.

See also
List of Drosera species

References

Carnivorous plants of Australia
Caryophyllales of Australia
Eudicots of Western Australia
Plants described in 1844
neesii